Casualties suffered by Palestinians in war:

Note: Article is not comprehensive. Some records of Palestinian casualties are under dispute.
The criteria used for this article: Casualties inflicted by war or combat. Casualties considered to be "unnecessary deaths" not included. Graph only includes casualties of Palestinian Arabs and not other actors.
Bold indicates major actors.

1920–1948

Total casualties for this period 20,631, including 6,092 fatalities.

1948–2021

Total casualties for this period 63,543, including 31,227 fatalities.

Gallery

See also
Casualties of Israeli attacks on the Gaza Strip
Zionist political violence
Timeline of the Israeli-Palestinian conflict
Violence in the Israeli–Palestinian conflict 2002
Violence in the Israeli–Palestinian conflict 2003
Violence in the Israeli–Palestinian conflict 2004
Violence in the Israeli–Palestinian conflict 2005
Violence in the Israeli–Palestinian conflict 2006
Violence in the Israeli–Palestinian conflict 2007
Violence in the Israeli–Palestinian conflict 2008
List of violent incidents in the Israeli–Palestinian conflict, 2011
Israeli casualties of war

References

 
British Empire
History of Palestine (region)